The Contemporary Historical Examination of Current Operations (CHECO), was a series of historical documents created by the United States Air Force History Office from 1964 through 1979, about operations in Southeast Asia, during the Vietnam War. The series produced over 200 reports – many have been declassified in the early 1990s.

History
Project CHECO was an Air Force effort to document aerial operations in Southeast Asia, with emphasis on new forces, tactics and techniques, materials, and methods. The project was established by the Air Force Chief of Staff in June 1962, under the command of Headquarters Pacific Forces and the 2nd Air Division; redesignated 7th Air Force in 1966.

List of reports

Vietnam War
United States Air Force